The 2010 Stanford Cardinal football team represented Stanford University in the 2010 NCAA Division I FBS football season. The Cardinal were led by head coach Jim Harbaugh, who was in his 4th and final season before leaving to become head coach of the San Francisco 49ers. Harbaugh ended his four-year tenure at Stanford having taken a team that finished 1–11 in the year prior to his arrival, to a team that ended the regular season 11–1. They played their home games at Stanford Stadium and were members of the Pacific-10 Conference.

Stanford's sole loss was to conference champion Oregon. They defeated Virginia Tech 40–12 in the Orange Bowl for the first BCS bowl victory in program history.

Schedule

Roster

Rankings

Game summaries

Sacramento State

Andrew Luck threw for 316 yards and a career-high four touchdowns as Stanford routed Sacramento State, 52–17. Doug Baldwin caught an 81-yard touchdown strike from Luck in the first quarter, the eighth-longest Stanford touchdown reception in school history, and caught another 15-yard touchdown pass in the second quarter. Three different Stanford rushers scored from within the two-yard line. For the Hornets, Kyle Monson returned a punt 70 yards for a touchdown, the first Sacramento State punt return for a score in seven years, and kicker Chris Diniz matched his career-longest field goal with a 52-yard kick in the fourth quarter.

at UCLA

Stanford safety Michael Thomas (top, left photo) stripped the ball and ran 21 yards for one touchdown, and Stanford quarterback Andrew Luck rushed for a career-best 63 yards and threw for 151 yards and two more touchdowns as Stanford shut out UCLA 35–0.  It was the first time UCLA had lost at home to Stanford since 1996 and was the first shutout UCLA had suffered at home since a 17–0 loss to California on October 16, 1999. It was also the first time Stanford had achieved a road shutout against an opponent since 1974 and the first time since 1941 that Stanford had shut out UCLA.

Wake Forest

In their 2009 meeting, the Demon Deacons defeated the Cardinal 24–17 at BB&T Field in Winston-Salem, North Carolina, but the Cardinal got revenge in this game, scoring touchdowns on their first eight possessions on the way to a 68–24 rout. Quarterback Andrew Luck has scored 11 touchdowns in the first three games. This is the fifth time in 36 seasons, and the first time since 2001 that the Cardinal has started 3–0. The win is the 13th in Stanford's last 15 home games. They are averaging 51.7 points per game through three games, the best offensive start to a season for the Cardinal since scoring 164 points in the first three games of the 1923 season. This was the most points Stanford had scored in a game since 1968 when the Cardinal scored 68 points against San Jose State. Wake Forest has given up 116 points combined in its last three games. This was the most points allowed by Wake Forest since a 72–13 loss to Florida State in 1995.

at Notre Dame

Owen Marecic scored on a one-yard touchdown plunge, then returned an interception for a touchdown two plays later as Stanford defeated Notre Dame 37–14, the team's first win in South Bend since 1992. Stanford placekicker Nate Whitaker added five field goals to tie a Stanford single-game record to help the Cardinal move to 4–0 for the first time since 1986.

at Oregon

    
    
    
    
    
    
    
    
    
    
    
    
    

The Cardinal started out quickly, scoring three touchdowns in less than five minutes of the first quarter aided by two Duck turnovers. But the Ducks used a risky onside kick to keep the score close at halftime, and in the second half, held the Cardinal scoreless. Meanwhile, Ducks quarterback Darron Thomas threw for 238 yards and three touchdowns and ran for another, while running back LaMichael James rushed for three touchdowns on a career-high 257 yards. Two interceptions by Duck cornerback Cliff Harris and a fourth-quarter fumble by Stanford receiver Chris Owusu sealed the game for the Ducks.

USC

    
    
    
    
    
    
    
    
    
    
    

Nate Whitaker kicked a 30-yard field goal as time expired to give the Cardinal a dramatic 37–35 victory over the visiting Trojans. Whitaker had missed a PAT earlier in the fourth quarter, and USC capitalized on the miss to go ahead of Stanford 35–34 with just over a minute to play. But Andrew Luck led the Cardinal on a nine-play, 62-yard drive to set up Whitaker's game winner. In an evenly matched back-and-forth game, Luck and Trojan quarterback Matt Barkley each threw for three touchdowns.

Washington State

Andrew Luck threw for three touchdowns as the Cardinal defeated the Cougars 38–28 to improve their record to 7–1, their best start since the season they appeared in the 1971 Rose Bowl. Stepfan Taylor added two more rushing touchdowns for Stanford. Washington State quarterback Jeff Tuel threw for four touchdowns on the day, including two in the last four minutes of the game to keep the final score close.

at Washington

Stepfan Taylor ran for two touchdowns, and quarterback Andrew Luck ran 51 yards for another as the Cardinal shut out the Huskies 41–0, the worst shutout for the Huskies at home since 1976. The highly touted matchup between NFL quarterback prospects Luck and Jake Locker turned into a lopsided affair as Washington could only manage 104 yards of offense, as Locker went 7 for 14 with only 88 yards passing, was sacked three times, and intercepted twice.

Arizona

In highly anticipated matchup for second place in the Pac-10, Stanford overwhelmed Arizona 42–17. Quarterback Andrew Luck threw for 293 yards and two touchdowns, and receiver Chris Owusu caught 9 passes for 165 yards and a touchdown. The Cardinal defense, meanwhile, intercepted Arizona quarterback Nick Foles and held the Wildcats to 3 points in the first half. Though they allowed two late touchdowns, Stanford answered each on its next possession with a long drive that culminated in a touchdown run from Stepfan Taylor.

Arizona State

With its usually explosive offense held in check by the Sun Devils, the Cardinal relied on their defense to keep the game close until a fourth-quarter drive put them on top of the Sun Devils, 17–13. After scoring on its first drive, the Stanford rushing game was held to 128 yards on 42 carries. Quarterback Andrew Luck fumbled and threw an interception, but had enough left to engineer a fourth-quarter drive finished with an Owen Marecic one-yard touchdown plunge. Stanford moved to 9–1 on the year, its best start since 1951.

at California

    
    
    
    
    
    
    
    
    
    

Andrew Luck led the Cardinal to scores on all eight possessions in which he participated—including three touchdown drives of more than 80 yards—as the Cardinal cruised to a 48–14 victory, its most lopsided victory in the Big Game since 1930, when Stanford shut out California 41–0.  Luck was 16 of 20 for 235 yards and 2 touchdown passes. Stepfan Taylor scored on three short touchdown runs, but Luck was Stanford's leading rusher with 72 yards, 58 of which came on a broken play in which he stiff-armed a Cal defender and continued for another 20 yards. Stanford's 48 points tied with Cal's 1975 total for the most points scored by either team in 113 Big Games. Both Bears touchdowns came on fourth-quarter trick plays: a pass from receiver Keenan Allen to Marvin Jones, and with 15 seconds left in the game, an Allen lateral to Isi Sofele. Stanford remains in contention for an at-large BCS berth while the Golden Bears need one more win to attain of bowl-eligibility.

Oregon State

    
    
    
    
    
    

The Cardinal closed out its best-ever regular season at home with a 38–0 victory over the Beavers. Andrew Luck threw four touchdown passes for a total of 28 on the year, setting a new Stanford single-season record, and surpassing John Elway and Steve Stenstrom. Meanwhile, the Stanford defense intercepted Beavers quarterback Ryan Katz three times and sacked him four times, one of which resulted in a fumble recovered by the Cardinal. The shutout was Stanford's third of the season and Oregon State's first since 2002. Coupled with losses by Boise State and LSU, the win moved Stanford to #4 in the BCS standings, a position which would assure them an at-large bid in a BCS bowl for the first time (Stanford last won an automatic BCS bid to the 2000 Rose Bowl).

Orange Bowl

    
    
    
    
    
    
    
    
    

Andrew Luck threw four touchdown passes, three to Coby Fleener and one to Zach Ertz, to defeat the Hokies to finish the season with 12 wins and the first BCS bowl victory in program history.

Awards and honors
September 13 – Cornerback Mike Thomas was named Pac-10 Defensive Player of the Week.
September 27 – Placekicker Nate Whitaker was named Pac-10 Special Teams Player of the Week.
 November 8 – Quarterback Andrew Luck was named Pac-10 Offensive Player of the Week.
 November 17 – Fullback/linebacker Owen Marecic has been named a first-team selection on the Pac-10 All-Academic Football Team. Earlier this month, he was named National Football Foundation Scholar-Athlete Award winner and is a finalist for the William V. Campbell Trophy, known as the academic Heisman.
 November 22 – Quarterback Andrew Luck was named Pac-10 Offensive Player of the Week.
 November 29 – Linebacker Chase Thomas was named Pac-10 Defensive Player of the Week
 January 10, 2011 – Owen Marecic was named Paul Hornung Award winner, the most versatile player.

References

External links

Stanford
Stanford Cardinal football seasons
Orange Bowl champion seasons
Stanford Cardinal football